The West Plum Bush Creek Bridge, near Last Chance, Colorado, is a historic concrete rigid frame bridge that is listed on the National Register of Historic Places. Like the similar Plum Bush Creek Bridge less than four miles away, it brings U.S. Highway 36 across the Plum Bush Creek. It was designed by the Colorado Department of Highways and built by Peter Kiewit Sons Construction Co. It was listed on the National Register of Historic Places in 2002.

It was deemed significant as a good example and a rare surviving example of its type, in its area.

See also

References

External links 
More photos of the West Plum Bush Creek Bridge at Wikimedia Commons

Road bridges on the National Register of Historic Places in Colorado
Buildings and structures in Washington County, Colorado
National Register of Historic Places in Washington County, Colorado
U.S. Route 36
Bridges of the United States Numbered Highway System
Concrete bridges in the United States